Authentic is the fourth album from Joey Pearson.

Track listing 
 "When You Believe"
 "I'll Show You Love"
 "Everything About You"
 "No Guarantees"
 "I Wish"
 "Back To Georgia"

2006 albums
Joey Pearson albums